James MacGregor Hunter (born June 22, 1964) is a former Major League baseball pitcher who played eight games with the Milwaukee Brewers during the 1991 MLB season.

The Montreal Expos originally drafted Hunter out of the University of Georgia in 1985. The Brewers bought his contract in the following year. However, he did not make his Major League debut until 1991. He played in a total of eight games, starting in six of those, and posted an 0–5 record with a 7.26 ERA. Hunter was granted free agency that same October and did not play for another Major League club.

External links
Player profile from the Baseball Almanac
Player profile from Baseball Reference
 Profile at the Peachtree Ridge High School website.

1964 births
Living people
Baseball players from Jersey City, New Jersey
Milwaukee Brewers players
Jamestown Expos players
Burlington Expos players
Beloit Brewers players
Stockton Ports players
El Paso Diablos players
Denver Zephyrs players
New Orleans Zephyrs players
Buffalo Bisons (minor league) players
Colorado Springs Sky Sox players